Vladimir Obraztsov (born January 25, 1940) is a Soviet sprint canoeist who competed in the late 1960s. He won a bronze medal in the K-2 500 m event at the 1966 ICF Canoe Sprint World Championships in East Berlin.

References

Большая олимпийская энциклопедия 
Profile at Olympic.kz 

Living people
1940 births
Soviet male canoeists
ICF Canoe Sprint World Championships medalists in kayak